The 1996 Football League Trophy Final (known as the Auto Windscreens Shields Trophy for sponsorship reasons) was the 13th final of the domestic football cup competition for teams from the Second and Third Division of the Football League. The match was played at Wembley on 14 April 1996, and was contested by Rotherham United and Shrewsbury Town. Rotherham United won the match 2–1, with Nigel Jemson scoring both goals for the winning team.

Match details

External links
Official website

EFL Trophy Finals
Football League Trophy Final 1996
Football League Trophy Final 1996
Football League Trophy Final